Scott Joseph Schwab (born July 9, 1972) is an American politician serving as the 32nd Secretary of State of Kansas. He served as a member of the Kansas House of Representatives, representing the 49th district, from 2009 to 2019. He also served as Speaker pro tempore of the Kansas House of Representatives from 2017 to 2019. He received national attention when his son, Caleb, was killed in an accident on the Schlitterbahn Kansas City, Kansas water park's Verrückt water slide. In November 2018, he was elected Kansas Secretary of State.

Early life 
In 1994, Schwab earned a Bachelor of Arts from Fort Hays State University. After college, he worked as an agent for the Kansas Farm Bureau until 1999. He worked in the sales field until 2010, and then became the executive vice president of CompDME.

Campaigns 

Schwab began serving as a member of the Kansas House of Representatives in June 2003. In 2004, he won the primary in the Republican district with 69.1% of the vote, against Shannon Giles.

In 2006, he chose to run in the Republican primary for the 3rd Congressional District, a seat held at that time by four-term Democratic incumbent, Dennis Moore. Schwab faced banker Chuck Ahner of Overland Park, Thomas Scherer of Merriam and Paul Showen of Shawnee. Ahner won the 3rd District primary with 51.9% to Schwab's 32.5% of the vote. Benjamin B. Hodge won the Republican primary for the District 49 seat with 52.7% of the vote, and succeeded Schwab in the state House.

In 2008, Schwab ran again for his old 49th District seat, was unopposed in the primary, and defeated Democrat Kristi Boone in the general election.

In 2017, Schwab announced that he would be a candidate for Kansas Secretary of State in the 2018 election. He said he was not interested in rolling back voting standards supported by then-incumbent Secretary of State Kris Kobach, but that his experience as House Speaker pro tem and as chair of the elections and insurance committees qualified him for the position.

Schwab filed to run for reelection in 2022 and won the GOP nomination despite rejecting the false fraud claims of the former President.

Political positions
Regarding LGBT issues, Schwab believes being gay is a "lifestyle choice". He is against same-sex marriage and describes himself as pro-life. Schwab opposes legalization of medical marijuana, saying "this would be an attempt to legalize marijuana. It has no benefit for pain management. All it does is make you crave another bag of chips."

After the death of his son at a water park, Schwab supported additional government regulations on the inspection of water parks.

Personal life 
Schwab's 10-year-old son, Caleb, was decapitated on August 7, 2016, in an accident on the Verrückt water slide at the Schlitterbahn Kansas City waterpark. The family received a reported $20 million settlement. Schwab was criticized for taking advantage of Texas legal provisions that permitted him to sue for a higher amount than that allowed by a Kansas law that he, as a state lawmaker, voted for in 2014. In March 2018, Schlitterbahn and three current or former employees were indicted by the Kansas Attorney General on charges related to Caleb's death. The charges against the defendants were dismissed due to prosecutorial misconduct with the grand jury. Schwab and his wife, Michele, have three surviving children.

References

External links
 
 Kansas Legislature - Scott Schwab
 Project Vote Smart profile
 Kansas Votes profile
 Follow the Money campaign contributions:
 2002, 2004, 2008

|-

1972 births
Living people
21st-century American politicians
Fort Hays State University alumni
Republican Party members of the Kansas House of Representatives
People from Great Bend, Kansas
Politicians from Olathe, Kansas
Secretaries of State of Kansas